Jørgen Jørgensen (born 1 April 1936) is a Danish former cyclist. He competed in the 100 km cycling team time trial at the 1960 Summer Olympics as a member of the four-man Danish team alongside Knud Enemark Jensen, Niels Baunsøe, and Vagn Bangsborg. The event was held on 26 August 1960 at the Viale Cristoforo Colombo in Rome, and the temperatures during the race reached . He dropped out of the race during the first lap due to heat stroke.

Athletic career 
The following are Jørgensen's results:

1957

1958

1959 

†: The athlete is not listed as having competed in any stages other than the 1st stage of the 1959 peace race, and is not listed amongst the finishers of the entire race.

1960 

†: The athlete is only listed in some stages of the 1960 peace race, but was given a final standing and therefore likely participated in the other stages.

References

External links
 

1936 births
Living people
Danish male cyclists
Olympic cyclists of Denmark
Cyclists at the 1960 Summer Olympics
Cyclists from Copenhagen